Kårstein Eidem Løvaas (born 10 November 1967) is a Norwegian politician for the Conservative Party. He was elected to the Parliament of Norway from Vestfold in 2013 where he is member of the Standing Committee on Family and Cultural Affairs.

References 

Conservative Party (Norway) politicians
Members of the Storting
Vestfold politicians
1967 births
Living people
21st-century Norwegian politicians